Nazrul Academy is an academic research institution devoted to the study of the national poet of Bangladesh, Kazi Nazrul Islam, and his works including Nazrul Geeti. The academy is located in Moghbazar, Dhaka, Bangladesh.

History
Nazrul Academy was established by the poet Talim Hossain on 24 May 1968 in Dhaka in the then East Pakistan. Justice Abu Sayeed Chowdhury, the future president of Bangladesh, was the first chairman of the academy.

Functions and activities

Nazrul Academy Award
 Sohrab Hossain (1982)
Abdul Alim (1996)
 Begum Uma Kazi and Nilufar Yasmin (2003)
 Shahabuddin Ahmed and Mintu Rahman (2005)
 Rafiqul Islam and Abdul Mannan Syed (2006)
 Khalid Hossain and Asadul Haq (2007)
 A H Saidur Rahman and Askar Ibne Shaikh (2008)
 Mohammad Abdul Qayyum and Rawshan Ara Mustafiz (2009)
 Mustafa Zaman Abbasi (2012)
 M.A. Mannan (2014)
 Syed Abdul Hadi (2016)
Begum Jamila Alim (2019)

Notable alumni
Dilshad Nahar Kona
Rafiqul Islam

References

Research institutes in Bangladesh
Kazi Nazrul Islam
1968 establishments in East Pakistan
Organisations based in Dhaka